In mathematics, Euler's idoneal numbers (also called  suitable numbers or convenient numbers) are the positive integers D such that any integer expressible in only one way as x2 ± Dy2 (where x2 is relatively prime to Dy2) is a prime power or twice a prime power. In particular, a number that has two distinct representations as a sum of two squares is composite. Every idoneal number generates a set containing infinitely many primes and missing infinitely many other primes.

Definition
A positive integer n is idoneal if and only if it cannot be written as ab + bc + ac for distinct positive integers a, b, and c.

Conjecturally complete listing

The 65 idoneal numbers found by Leonhard Euler and Carl Friedrich Gauss and conjectured to be the only such numbers are
1, 2, 3, 4, 5, 6, 7, 8, 9, 10, 12, 13, 15, 16, 18, 21, 22, 24, 25, 28, 30, 33, 37, 40, 42, 45, 48, 57, 58, 60, 70, 72, 78, 85, 88, 93, 102, 105, 112, 120, 130, 133, 165, 168, 177, 190, 210, 232, 240, 253, 273, 280, 312, 330, 345, 357, 385, 408, 462, 520, 760, 840, 1320, 1365, and 1848 .
Results of Peter J. Weinberger from 1973 imply that at most two other idoneal numbers exist, and that the list above is complete if the generalized Riemann hypothesis holds (some sources incorrectly claim that Weinberger's results imply that there's at most one other idoneal number).

See also
List of unsolved problems in mathematics

Notes

References
 Z. I. Borevich and I. R. Shafarevich, Number Theory. Academic Press, NY, 1966, pp. 425–430.
 
 L. Euler, "An illustration of a paradox about the idoneal, or suitable, numbers", 1806
 G. Frei, Euler's convenient numbers, Math. Intell. Vol. 7 No. 3 (1985), 55–58 and 64.
 O-H. Keller, Ueber die "Numeri idonei" von Euler, Beitraege Algebra Geom., 16 (1983), 79–91. [Math. Rev. 85m:11019]
 G. B. Mathews, Theory of Numbers, Chelsea, no date, p. 263.
 P. Ribenboim, "Galimatias Arithmeticae", in Mathematics Magazine 71(5) 339 1998 MAA or, 'My Numbers, My Friends', Chap.11 Springer-Verlag 2000 NY
 J. Steinig, On Euler's ideoneal numbers, Elemente Math., 21 (1966), 73–88.
 A. Weil, Number theory: an approach through history; from Hammurapi to Legendre, Birkhaeuser, Boston, 1984; see p. 188.
 P. Weinberger, Exponents of the class groups of complex quadratic fields, Acta Arith., 22 (1973), 117–124.
 Ernst Kani, Idoneal Numbers And Some Generalizations, Ann. Sci. Math. Québec 35, No 2, (2011), 197-227.

External links
 K. S. Brown, Mathpages, Numeri Idonei
 M. Waldschmidt, Open Diophantine problems
 

Integer sequences
Unsolved problems in number theory
Leonhard Euler